Adam Paul Harvey (born 7 July 1984) is an English actor.

Early life
Harvey was born in High Wycombe, Buckinghamshire, the son of Andrea (née Foster) and Gordon Harvey, an engineer. He attended Sir William Ramsay School in Hazlemere, High Wycombe and in 1998 enrolled at JPA School of Drama and Dance, after which he began auditioning.

Career
His first professional role was in a commercial advertising the Nintendo 64. His first regular television role was in ITV1's short-lived soap opera Night and Day, in which he played Tom Brake. Other regular roles were Ralph Henshaw in Bedtime in 2002 (alongside Alun Armstrong), Russell in CITV's Girls in Love (2003–05) and Nathan Boothe in four series of ITV1's Where the Heart Is. He played the lead in BBC One's docudrama Dealing with Disasters (about London Nail Bomber David Copeland).

He has acted in a number of films, including My Brother Tom (2001), Son of Rambow (2007), the short 96 Ways to Say I Love You (2014) and Mad to Be Normal (formerly entitled Metanoia, 2017), a biopic of R. D. Laing, alongside a cast including David Tennant, Elisabeth Moss, Gabriel Byrne, David Bamber and Michael Gambon. He appeared in You, Me and Him, a comedy and This Weekend Will Change Your Life, a thriller, in 2018, and is due to appear in End of Term, a horror film, although as of September 2019, no release date has been announced.

In November 2013, he appeared in The Five(ish) Doctors Reboot, part of the 50th anniversary celebrations of Doctor Who. In November 2014, he had a role in Casualty. He has also appeared in two separate episodes of Doctors, playing different characters, firstly in November 2014 and, more recently, in September 2019.

Filmography

Personal life
He had a relationship with his Where the Heart Is co-star Georgia Tennant, who played his on-screen girlfriend, Alice Harding. They ended the relationship in 2006, but remain good friends.

He has a sister and three half-brothers, and is, as are they, first cousin, once removed of Peter Darvill-Evans as well as his younger brother, the composer Mark Darvill-Evans.

He is related on his father's side to Edward Stone, an eighteenth-century clergyman who discovered the active ingredient in Aspirin, as well as Irene Kathleen Stiles (1901–1964), who wrote romantic fiction under the pen name of Romilly Brent.

References

External links

Agent's biography of Adam Paul Harvey

1984 births
Living people
People from High Wycombe
English male television actors
English male film actors